Quarter bells are the bells that the clock mechanism strikes on each passing quarter of the hour. Often, as in the case of Big Ben, a different tune is played for each quarter. This enables people to be able to tell the time, without actually having to be within sight of the clock face.

See also
 Westminster Quarters

Bells (percussion)